Parapammene is a genus of moths belonging to the subfamily Olethreutinae of the family Tortricidae.

Species
Parapammene amphibola (Diakonoff, 1982)
Parapammene aurifascia Kuznetzov, 1981
Parapammene cyanodesma Diakonoff, 1976
Parapammene dichroramphana (Kennel, 1900)
Parapammene dyserasta (Turner, 1916)
Parapammene ellipticopa (Meyrick, 1934)
Parapammene glaucana (Kennel, 1901)
Parapammene harmologa (Obraztsov, 1968)
Parapammene hexaphora (Meyrick, in Caradja & Meyrick, 1935)
Parapammene imitatrix Kuznetzov, in Ler, 1986
Parapammene inobservata Kuznetzov, 1962
Parapammene isocampta (Meyrick, 1914)
Parapammene longipalpana Kuznetzov, 1992
Parapammene petulantana (Kennel, 1901)
Parapammene reversa Komai, 1999
Parapammene selectana (Christoph, 1882)

See also
List of Tortricidae genera

References

External links
tortricidae.com

Grapholitini
Tortricidae genera